Bunila is a commune in Hunedoara County, Transylvania, Romania. It is composed of five villages: Alun (Álun), Bunila, Cernișoara  (Csernisorfloresza), Poienița Voinii (Poienicavojni) and Vadu Dobrii (Vádudobri).

References

Communes in Hunedoara County
Localities in Transylvania